Thomas Musgrave (or Moscrof) was an English 16th-century university vice-chancellor,

Musgrave was a Doctor of Physic and a Fellow of Merton College, Oxford. In 1523, Musgrave was appointed Vice-Chancellor of the University of Oxford.

References

Bibliography
 

Year of birth unknown
Year of death unknown
16th-century English medical doctors
Fellows of Merton College, Oxford
Vice-Chancellors of the University of Oxford